Contomastix leachei is a species of teiid lizard endemic to Argentina.

References

leachei
Reptiles of Argentina
Endemic fauna of Argentina
Reptiles described in 1897
Taxa named by Mario Giacinto Peracca